FC Midtjylland ("Central Jutland") is a Danish professional football club based in Herning and Ikast in the western part of Jutland. The club is the result of a merger between Ikast FS and Herning Fremad. Midtjylland competes in the Danish Superliga, which they have won three times, most recently in 2020.

Club history

FC Midtjylland was founded by Johnny Rune, a carpenter and owner of a private business in the wood-supply industry, and Steen Hessel, an authorized Mercedes-Benz dealer.

The two men wanted to unite the football clubs Ikast FS (founded 1935) and Herning Fremad (founded 1918) – clubs that for decades had been strong rivals, but had never played any significant role in Danish football. Ikast FS had some success in the late 1970s and '80s and made three Danish Cup final appearances, but had never been a top team in the Danish league. At least ten years had passed with the two clubs being unable to agree on a merger, but on 6 April 1999, a deal was finalised and announced at a press conference the next day.

In 2000, Midtjylland were promoted to the top-flight Danish Superliga after a season in which the team had gathered more points than any other team in the history of the first division.

In July 2014, Matthew Benham (owner of English club Brentford) became the majority shareholder of Midtjylland's parent company FCM Holding. In the 2014–15 season, they won the Danish football championship for the first time. Later on, they won two league titles in 2017–18 and 2019–20, then qualified to the 2020–21 UEFA Champions League group stage for the first time in their history.

Scouting and developing
Midtjylland have built a reputation of finding and developing promising talents, and have a highly regarded youth academy.

In July 2004, Midtjylland was the first Danish club to establish their own football academy, similar to that of French side Nantes. The academy attracts players from throughout Denmark, as well as players from FC Ebedei, a partnering club in Nigeria. The club has developed a network of over 100 clubs located in the western part of Jutland.

In 2008, Danish centre-back Simon Kjær, a talent of the academy, was sold to Palermo for a transfer fee of approximately DKK30 million (€4 million). In 2010, Sune Kiilerich, another talent of the academy, was sold to Sampdoria, while Winston Reid, an academy product and New Zealand international, was sold to West Ham United for DKK32 million (€4.26 million). In 2016, vice-captain Erik Sviatchenko was sold for £1.5 million to Celtic.

Other notable sales of academy products include Pione Sisto to Celta Vigo, Rasmus Nissen to Ajax, Andreas Poulsen to Borussia Mönchengladbach and Mikkel Duelund to Dynamo Kyiv.

Stadium

In 2004, the team moved to a new stadium in Herning with a capacity of 11,432 spectators. Midtjylland was the first Danish club to sell the stadium naming rights to a sponsor, resulting in the name "SAS Arena" which has since been changed to MCH Arena. The stadium's opening match was on 27 March; it proved to be a success, with Midtjylland beating AB 6–0. Five of the goals were scored by Egyptian striker Mohamed Zidan.

On 22 June 2022, the club started an expansion of MCH Arena that will add a new hospitality lounge and 11 new VIP boxes. The expansion will increase the total capacity by 720 seats, taking the capacity from 11,432 to a total of 12,152. The expansion is believed to be finished in December 2023.

Supporters
Black Wolves is the official fanclub of FC Midtjylland. It was founded in the beginning of August 1999, as the official fanclub of Ikast FS 1993 "Yellow Flames" changed their name at an extraordinary general meeting. Ultra Boys Midtjylland is the first unofficial faction in Midtjylland, established in 2007 and later renamed Ultras Midtjylland. In 2014, Midtjylland got its second unofficial faction, a youth faction called Midtjylland Ungdom. As of today, there are three unofficial factions: Zartow, Chaos Crew, and Midtjylland Ungdom. Collectively, all FC Midtjylland supporters go under the name of Hedens Drenge. 

Hedens Drenge is currently Midtjylland’s largest fan-based social media account, with a following of around 11,000 on Instagram and Facebook combined. 

The club's main rival is Viborg FF. This rivalry is often referred to as The Battle of the Heath, The Battle of Hatred, and The Derby of Midtjylland. The derby is claimed to be the second biggest in Denmark behind that of FC København and Brøndby IF.

Recent history

Honours
 Danish Superliga
Winners (3): 2014–15, 2017–18, 2019–20
 Runners-up (5): 2006–07, 2007–08, 2018–19, 2020–21, 2021–22
 1st Division
Winners (1): 1999–2000
 Danish Cup
Winners (2): 2018–19, 2021–22
 Runners-up (4): 2002–03, 2004–05, 2009–10, 2010–11

Players

Current squad
As of 31 January 2023

Out on loan

Incoming players

Youth team
See: FC Midtjylland Academy

Notable players
1990s
  Søren Skriver (1994–2004)
  Frank Kristensen (1997–2011, 2013–2014)
  Peter Skov-Jensen (1999–2005)
2000s
  Mohamed Zidan (2003–2005)
  Danny Califf (2008–2009)
  Mads Albæk (2004–2013)
  Kristijan Ipša (2008–2013)
  Winston Reid (2005–2010)
  Mikkel Thygesen (2004–2007, 2007–2011)
  Jonas Lössl (2008–2014, 2021–)
  Simon Kjær (2007–2008)
2010s
  Petter Andersson (2012–2016)
  Rafael van der Vaart (2016–2018)
  Sylvester Igboun (2010–2015)
  Paul Onuachu (2013–2019)
  Frank Onyeka (2018–2021)
  Jakob Poulsen (2010–2012, 2014–2019)
  Rasmus Nissen (2012–2018)
  Morten "Duncan" Rasmussen (2012–2016)
  Pione Sisto (2013–2016, 2020–)
  Bill Hamid (2018–2020)
  Tim Sparv (2014–2020)
2020s
  Evander (2019-2022)
  Anders Dreyer (2020–2021, 2022)
  Vagner Love (2022)

Personnel

Current technical staff

Management

Coaches
 Ove Pedersen (1 July 1999 – 30 June 2002)
 Troels Bech (1 July 2002 – 31 December 2003)
 Erik Rasmussen (1 Jan 2004 – 30 June 2008)
 Thomas Thomasberg (1 July 2008 – 11 August 2009)
 Allan Kuhn (12 Aug 2009 – 15 April 2011)
 Glen Riddersholm (16 April 2011– 25 June 2015)
 Jess Thorup (12 July 2015 – 10 October 2018)
 Kenneth Andersen (10 October 2018 – 19 August 2019)
 Brian Priske (19 August 2019 – 29 May 2021)
 Bo Henriksen (31 May 2021 – 28 July 2022)
 Albert Capellas (24 August 2022 – 13 March 2023)

FC Midtjylland in European competition

FC Midtjylland's first competitive European match was on 9 August 2001 in the 2001–02 UEFA Cup, playing Northern Ireland's Glentoran to a 1–1 draw in the first leg of the Qualifying Round before ultimately advancing to the First Round where they were eliminated by Sporting CP. In 2016 Midtjylland reached the Round of 32 of the 2015–16 UEFA Europa League, where they achieved a 2–1 home victory over Manchester United but would end up losing 6–3 on aggregate following the second leg.

UEFA club coefficient ranking

References

External links

Ikast FS's website (archived 19 June 2005)
Herning Fremad's website
Black Wolves – Official fanclub
Messecenter Herning's website

 
Football clubs in Denmark
Association football clubs established in 1999
Sport in Herning
1999 establishments in Denmark
Multi-sport clubs in Denmark